Charles Mitchell may refer to:

 Charles Mitchell (academic) (born 1965), professor of law at University College, London
 Charles Mitchell (American football) (born 1989), American football player
 Charles Mitchell (basketball) (born 1993), American basketball player
 Charles Mitchell (colonial administrator) (1836–1899), colonial administrator in the British Colonial Service
 Charles Mitchell (footballer), British soccer player
 Charles Mitchell (shipbuilder) (1820–1895), British shipbuilder
 Charles Mitchell (songwriter), American songwriter of the 1930s and 1940s
 Charles Mitchell (–1876?), mulatto slave, owned by James Tilton, who escaped from the Washington Territory to the British Crown Colony of Victoria in 1860
 C. Ainsworth Mitchell (1867–1948), English chemist and forensic scientist
 Charles Bayard Mitchell (1857–1942), American bishop of the Methodist Episcopal Church
 Charles E. Mitchell (1877–1955), American banker
 Charles F. Mitchell (1806–1865), U.S. Representative from New York
 Charles H. Mitchell (born 1940), American academic administrator and American football player
 Charles Le Moyne Mitchell (1844–1890), U.S. Representative from Connecticut
 Charles Lewis Mitchell (1829–1912), state legislator in Massachusetts
 Charles Louis Mitchell (1859–1918), Scottish artist
 Charles Richmond Mitchell (1872–1942), Canadian lawyer, judge, cabinet minister in Alberta
 Charles S. Mitchell (1856–1922), American newspaper publisher and editor
 Charles William Mitchell (1854–1903), English pre-Raphaelite painter
 Charlie Mitchell (American football) (1920–1999), defensive back in the National Football League
 Charlie Mitchell (baseball) (born 1962), baseball player
 Charlie Mitchell (footballer) (born 1948), Scottish American former soccer defender and coach
 Chuck Mitchell (1927–1992), American actor
 Mitch Mitchell (guitarist) (Charles Mitchell III, born 1959), musician and former member of Guided by Voices

See also
 Charles Mitchel (disambiguation)
 Charles Mitchell Whiteside (1854–1924), American politician and businessman